Anna Jaeger Brown (born July 26, 1952) is a senior United States district judge of the United States District Court for the District of Oregon.

Early life
Brown was born in Portland, Oregon, in 1952, and attended high school there at St. Mary's Academy where she graduated in 1970. She received a Bachelor of Science degree from Portland State University in 1975. Brown continued her education at Northwestern School of Law (now Lewis and Clark Law School) where she received a Juris Doctor in 1980. While in law school she worked as a law clerk for Judge John C. Beatty of the Multnomah County Circuit Court in Portland from 1978 to 1980. Following law school in 1980, Brown entered private legal practice in Portland where she remained until 1992.

Judicial career

State judicial service
In 1992, Brown became a judge on the Multnomah County District Court. She was on that court until 1994 when she was elevated to the Multnomah County Circuit Court.

Federal judicial service
On April 22, 1999, Brown was nominated to the United States District Court for the District of Oregon by President Bill Clinton. She had been nominated to the seat vacated by Malcolm F. Marsh who took senior status on April 16, 1998. She was confirmed on October 15, 1999 by the United States Senate and received her commission on October 26. She took the oath of office and entered on duty on October 27. She took senior status on July 27, 2017.

References

External links

RIAA Racketeering Lawsuit Revived; Will it Survive?

1952 births
Living people
Lewis & Clark Law School alumni
Lewis & Clark College faculty
Portland State University alumni
Lawyers from Portland, Oregon
Oregon state court judges
Judges of the United States District Court for the District of Oregon
St. Mary's Academy (Portland, Oregon) alumni
United States district court judges appointed by Bill Clinton
20th-century American judges
21st-century American judges
20th-century American women judges
21st-century American women judges